Pseudodaphnella crypta is a species of sea snail, a marine gastropod mollusk in the family Raphitomidae.

Description
The length of the shell attains 8 mm. The shell is off-white and very rigid to the touch with brown spots lining the shell on both the outside and the inside.

Distribution
This marine species occurs off Papua New Guinea.

References

External links
 Fedosov A. E. & Puillandre N. (2012) Phylogeny and taxonomy of the Kermia–Pseudodaphnella (Mollusca: Gastropoda: Raphitomidae) genus complex: a remarkable radiation via diversification of larval development. Systematics and Biodiversity 10(4): 447-477
 Gastropods.com: Pseudodaphnella crypta

crypta
Gastropods described in 2012